This article presents lists of literary events and publications in the 16th century.

Events

1501
Italic type (cut by Francesco Griffo) is first used by Aldus Manutius at the Aldine Press in Venice, in an octavo edition of Virgil's Aeneid. He also publishes an edition of Petrarch's Le cose volgari and first adopts his dolphin and anchor device.
1502
Aldine Press editions appear of Dante's Divine Comedy, Herodotus's Histories and Sophocles.
1507
King James IV grants a patent for the first printing press in Scotland to Walter Chapman and Andrew Myllar.
1508
April 4 – John Lydgate's The Complaint of the Black Knight becomes the first book printed in Scotland.
The earliest known printed edition of the chivalric romance Amadis de Gaula, as edited and expanded by Garci Rodríguez de Montalvo, is published in Castilian at Zaragoza.
Elia Levita completes writing the Bovo-Bukh.
1509
Desiderius Erasmus writes The Praise of Folly while staying with Thomas More in England.
1510
April 10 – Henry Cornelius Agrippa pens the dedication of De occulta philosophia libri tres to Johannes Trithemius.
1510–1511
Ein kurtzweilig Lesen von Dyl Ulenspiegel, geboren uß dem Land zu Brunßwick, wie er sein leben volbracht hat … is published by printer  in Strassburg in Early New High German, the first appearance of the trickster character Till Eulenspiegel in print.
1512
The word "masque" is first used to denote a poetic drama.
1513
The Aldine Press editiones principes of Lycophron, Lysias, Pindar and Plato is published by Aldus Manutius in Venice.
Niccolò Machiavelli is banished from Florence by the House of Medici and writes The Prince as De Principatibus (On Principalities) in Tuscany this summer.
Johannes Potken publishes the first Ge'ez text, Psalterium David et Cantica aliqua, at Rome.
1514
May 15 – The earliest printed edition of Saxo Grammaticus' 12th-century Scandinavian history Gesta Danorum, edited by Christiern Pedersen from an original found near Lund, is published as Danorum Regum heroumque Historiae by Jodocus Badius in Paris.
Gregorio de Gregorii begins printing Kitab Salat al-Sawa'i (a Christian book of hours), the first known book printed in the Arabic alphabet using movable type. It is falsely assigned in Venice to Fano.
1515
Christoph Froschauer becomes the first printer in Zürich.
1516
Samuel Nedivot prints the 14th-century Hebrew Sefer Abudirham in Fez, the first book printed in Africa.
Paolo Ricci translates the 13th-century Kabbalistic work Sha'are Orah by Joseph ben Abraham Gikatilla as Portae Lucis.
1519
Apokopos by Bergadis, the first book in Modern Greek, is printed in Venice.
The chivalric romance Libro del muy esforzado e invencible caballero Don Claribalte (Book of the much striving and invincible knight Don Claribalte), the first work by Gonzalo Fernández de Oviedo y Valdés, is published in Valencia, Spain, by Juan Viñao. In a foreword dedicating it to Ferdinand, Duke of Calabria, Oviedo relates that it has been conceived and written in the Captaincy General of Santo Domingo (the Caribbean island of Hispaniola), where he has been working since 1514. It can therefore claim to be the first literary work created in the New World.
1521
June 29 or 30 – Neacșu's letter is the oldest surviving dateable document written primarily in Romanian (using the Romanian Cyrillic alphabet).
1522
Luo Guanzhong's 14th-century compilation Romance of the Three Kingdoms is first printed as Sanguozhi Tongsu Yanyi.
Luther Bible: Martin Luther's translation of the New Testament into Early New High German from Greek, Das newe Testament Deutzsch, is published.
1522–24
St Ignatius Loyola writes his Exercitia spiritualia (Spiritual Exercises), on which Jesuit spirituality is based. It is published in 1548 after formal approval by Pope Paul III.
1524
Eyn Gespräch von dem gemaynen Schwabacher Kasten ("als durch Brüder Hainrich, Knecht Ruprecht, Kemerin, Spüler, und irem Maister, des Handtwercks der Wüllen Tuchmacher") is published in Germany, the first publication in the "Schwabacher" blackletter typeface.
1526
Spring – The first complete printed translation of the New Testament into English by William Tyndale arrives in England from Germany, having been printed in Worms. In October, Cuthbert Tunstall, Bishop of London, attempts to collect all the copies in his diocese and burn them.
The New Testament in Swedish, the first official Bible translation into Swedish, is made by Olaus Petri under royal patronage.
The first complete Dutch-language translation of the Bible is printed by Jacob van Liesvelt in Antwerp.
The Bibliotheca Corviniana in Ofen is destroyed by troops of the Ottoman Empire.
1530
January – The first printed translation of the Torah in English, by William Tyndale, is published in Antwerp for distribution in Britain.
An edition of Erasmus's Paraphrasis in Elegantiarum Libros Laurentii Vallae is the first book to use the Roman form of the Garamond typeface cut by Claude Garamond.
Paracelsus finishes writing Paragranum.
1533
October – The censors of the Collège de Sorbonne condemn François Rabelais' Pantagruel as obscene.
1534
Luther Bible: Martin Luther's Biblia: das ist die gantze Heilige Schrifft Deudsch, a translation of the complete Bible into German, is printed by Hans Lufft in Wittenberg, with woodcut illustrations.
Cambridge University Press is granted a royal charter by King Henry VIII of England to print "all manner of books" and so becomes the first of the privileged presses.
Rabbi Asher Anchel's Mirkevet ha-Mishneh (a Tanakh concordance) is the first book printed in Yiddish (in Kraków).
1535
The earliest printed book in Estonian, a Catechism with a translation by Johann Koell from the Middle Low German Lutheran text of Simon Wanradt, is printed by Hans Lufft in Wittenberg for use in Tallinn.
1536
Petar Zoranić writes the first Croatian novel, the pastoral-allegorical Planine ("Mountains"); it first appears posthumously in Venice in 1569.
1537
Construction of the Biblioteca Marciana in Venice to the design of Jacopo Sansovino begins, continuing to 1560.
Paracelsus starts to write Astronomia Magna or the whole Philosophia Sagax of the Great and Little World.
December 28 – Ordonnance de Montpellier initiates a legal deposit system for books in the Kingdom of France.
1538
Paracelsus finishes writing Astronomia Magna or the whole Philosophia Sagax of the Great and Little World.
December 20 – Pietro Bembo is made a Cardinal.
1539
April – Printing of the Great Bible (The Byble in Englyshe) is completed. It is distributed to churches in England. Prepared by Myles Coverdale, it contains much material from the Tyndale Bible, unacknowledged as Tyndale's version is officially considered heretical.
Game Place House in Great Yarmouth becomes the first English building to be used regularly as a public theatre.
Marie Dentière writes an open letter to Marguerite of Navarre, sister of the King of France; the Epistre tres utile (Very useful letter) calls for expulsion of Catholic clergy from France.
The first printing press in North America is set up in Mexico City. Its first known book, Manual de Adultos, appears in 1540.
1540
Sir David Lyndsay's Middle Scots satirical morality play A Satire of the Three Estates is first performed, privately.
1541
Elia Levita's chivalric romance, the Bovo-Bukh, is first printed, becoming the earliest published secular work in Yiddish.
1542
La relación/The Account, written by Álvar Núñez Cabeza de Vaca, appears, as the first European publication devoted wholly to discussion of North America.
1550
Primož Trubar's Catechismus and Abecedarium, the first books in Slovene, are printed in Schwäbisch Hall.
Popol Vuh is written after a long oral tradition.
1551
An edition of the Book of Common Prayer becomes the first book printed in Ireland.
1552
June – Sir David Lyndsay's Middle Scots satirical morality play A Satire of the Three Estates is first performed publicly in full, at Cupar in Fife.
1554
Publication of Menno Simons' Uytgangh ofte bekeeringhe begins the Dutch Golden Age of literature.
1565
Torquato Tasso enters the service of Cardinal Luigi d'Este at Ferrara.
1567
October 14 – António Ferreira becomes Desembargador da Casa do Civel and leaves Coimbra for Lisbon.
Approximate date – The first publication in book form of the Chinese shenmo fantasy novel Fengshen Yanyi.
1571
October 7 – In the naval Battle of Lepanto, Miguel de Cervantes is wounded.
Michel de Montaigne retires from public life and isolates himself in the tower of the Château de Montaigne.
1572
England's Vagabonds Act 1572 prescribes punishment for rogues. This includes acting companies lacking formal patronage.
Luís Vaz de Camões of Portugal publishes his epic Os Lusíadas.
1575
September 26 – Miguel de Cervantes is captured by Barbary pirates, to be ransomed only five years later.
Sir Philip Sidney meets Penelope Devereux, the inspiration for his Astrophel and Stella.
1576
December – James Burbage builds The Theatre, London's first permanent public playhouse. This opens the great age of English Renaissance theatre.
1586
October 17 – The poet Sir Philip Sidney (born 1554) dies of wounds received at the Battle of Zutphen.
1590
A troupe of boy actors, the Children of Paul's, is suppressed due to its playwright John Lyly's role in the Marprelate controversy.
1596
Blackfriars Theatre opens in London.
1597
Ben Jonson is briefly jailed in Marshalsea Prison after his play The Isle of Dogs is suppressed.
1598
September 22 – Ben Jonson kills actor Gabriel Spenser in a duel, but is only held briefly in Newgate Prison.
December 28 – The Theatre in London is dismantled .
Thomas Bodley refounds the Bodleian Library at the University of Oxford.
1599
Spring/Summer – The Globe Theatre built in Southwark, London, utilises material from The Theatre.
June 4 – Bishops' Ban of 1599: Thomas Middleton's Microcynicon: Six Snarling Satires and John Marston's Scourge of Villainy are publicly burned as the English ecclesiastical authorities clamp down on published satire.
Late – The War of the Theatres, a satirical controversy, breaks out on the London stage.

New books
1500
This is the Boke of Cokery, the first known printed cookbook in English
Desiderius Erasmus – Collectanea Adagiorum (1st ed., Paris)
Singiraja – Maha Basavaraja Charitra
1501
Desiderius Erasmus – Handbook of a Christian Knight (Enchiridion militis Christiani)
Margery Kempe – The Book of Margery Kempe (posthumous)
Marko Marulić – Judita (written)
1502
Shin Maha Thilawuntha – Yazawin Kyaw
1503
William Dunbar – The Thrissil and the Rois
Euripides – Tragoediae
Approximate date: "Robin Hood and the Potter" (ballad)
1505
Georges Chastellain – Récollections des merveilles advenues en mon temps (posthumous)
Stephen Hawes
The Passtyme of Pleasure
The Temple of Glass
Lodovico Lazzarelli – Crater Hermetics (posthumous)
Pierre Le Baud – Cronique des roys et princes de Bretaigne armoricane (completed)
1508
William Dunbar – The Goldyn Targe
Erasmus of Rotterdam – Adagiorum chiliades (2nd ed., Venice)
Johannes Trithemius – De septem secundeis
1509
Manjarasa – Samyukta Koumudi
1510
Garci Rodríguez de Montalvo – Las sergas de Esplandián
Ruiz Paez de Ribera – Florisando
1511
The Demaũdes Joyous (joke book published by Wynkyn de Worde in English)
Erasmus – The Praise of Folly
1512
Henry Medwall – Fulgens and Lucrece
Huldrych Zwingli – De Gestis inter Gallos et Helvetios relatio
Il-yeon - The Samguk Yusa
1513
Mallanarya of Gubbi – Bhava Chintaratna
First translation of Virgil's Aeneid into English (Scots dialect) by Gavin Douglas
1514–15
Gian Giorgio Trissino – Sofonisba
1516
Henry Cornelius Agrippa
Dialogus de homine (Casale)
De triplici ratione cognoscendi Deum
Erasmus – Novum Instrumentum omne (Greek New Testament translation)
Robert Fabyan (anonymous; died c. 1512) – The New Chronicles of England and France
Marsilio Ficino – De triplici vita
Thomas More – Utopia
1517
Francysk Skaryna's Bible translation and printing
Teofilo Folengo's Baldo, a popular Italian work of comedy
1518
Henry Cornelius Agrippa – De originali peccato
Erasmus – Colloquies
Tantrakhyan (Nepal Bhasa literature)
1519
Santikirti – Santinatha Purana
1520
Scholars at Complutense University, Alcalá de Henares, under the direction of Diego Lopez de Zúñiga – Complutensian Polyglot Bible
1521
Goražde Psalter
1522
Luo Guanzhong (attrib.) – Romance of the Three Kingdoms; first publication
Martin Luther – Das newe Testament Deutzsch, translation of the New Testament into German
1523
Jacques Lefèvre d'Étaples – Nouveau Testament, translation of the New Testament into French
Martin Luther – , translation of the Pentateuch into German
Maximilianus Transylvanus – De Moluccis Insulis, the first published account of the Magellan–Elcano circumnavigation
1524
Philippe de Commines – Mémoires (Part 1: Books 1–6); first publication (Paris)
Martin Luther and Paul Speratus – Etlich Cristlich Lider: Lobgesang un Psalm ("Achtliederbuch"), the first Lutheran hymnal (Wittenberg)
Martin Luther and others – Eyn Enchiridion oder Handbüchlein (the "Erfurt Enchiridion"), two editions of a hymnal printed respectively by Johannes Loersfeld and Matthes Maler (Erfurt)
Johann Walter – Eyn geystlich Gesangk Buchleyn ("A sacred little hymnal") (Wittenberg)
1525
Pietro Bembo – Prose della volgar lingua
Francesco Giorgi – De harmonia mundi totius
Paracelsus – De septem puncti idolotriae christianae
Antonio Pigafetta – Relazione del primo viaggio intorno al mondo ("Report on the First Voyage Around the World"); partial publication (Paris)
1526
William Tyndale's New Testament Bible translation
1527
Hector Boece – Historia Scotorum
Philippe de Commines – Mémoires (Part 2: Books 7–8); first publication
Hans Sachs and Andreas Osiander – Eyn wunderliche Weyssagung von dem Babsttumb, wie es ihm biz an das endt der welt gehen sol ("A wonderful prophecy of the papacy about how things will go for it up until the end of the world")
1528
Baltissare Castiglione – The Book of the Courtier (Il Cortegiano)
Jacques Lefèvre d'Étaples – Ancien Testament, translation of the Old Testament into French
Francisco Delicado – Portrait of Lozana: The Lusty Andalusian Woman (Retrato de la Loçana andaluza)
William Tyndale – The Obedience of a Christian Man
1530
William Tyndale – The Practice of Prelates
1531
Henry Cornelius Agrippa – De occulta philosophia libri tres, Book One
Andrea Alciato – Emblemata
Sir Thomas Elyot – The Boke Named the Governour, the first English work concerning moral philosophy
Niccolò Machiavelli (posthumous) – Discourses on Livy
Paracelsus – Opus Paramirum (written in St. Gallen)
Michael Servetus – De trinitatis erroribus ("On the Errors of the Trinity")
1532
Niccolò Machiavelli (posthumous) – The Prince
François Rabelais (as Alcofribas Nasier) – Pantagruel (Les horribles et épouvantables faits et prouesses du très renommé Pantagruel Roi des Dipsodes, fils du Grand Géant Gargantua)
Feliciano de Silva – Don Florisel de Niquea
1533
Henry Cornelius Agrippa – Books Two and Three of De occulta philosophia libri tres
Antoine Marcourt (as Pantople) – Le livre des marchans
1534
Asher Anchel – Mirkevet ha-Mishneh
Martin Luther (translator) – "Luther Bible" (Biblia)
François Rabelais (as Alcofribas Nasier) – Gargantua (La vie très horrifique du grand Gargantua, père de Pantagruel)
Polydore Vergil – Historia Anglica
1535
John Bourchier, 2nd Baron Berners – Huon of Bordeaux
Simon Wanradt and Johann Koell – Catechism
Bible d'Olivétan (first translation of the complete Bible made from the original Hebrew and Greek into French)
1536
John Calvin – Institutes of the Christian Religion (in Latin)
Sir Thomas Elyot – The Castel of Helth
Paracelsus – Die große Wundarzney
1538
Hélisenne de Crenne – Les Angoisses douloureuses qui procèdent d'amours
Sir Thomas Elyot – The dictionary of syr Thomas Eliot knyght (Latin to English)
1539
Robert Estienne – Alphabetum Hebraicum
1540
Historia Scotorum of Hector Boece, translated into vernacular Scots by John Bellenden at the special request of James V of Scotland
The Byrth of Mankynde, the first printed book in English on obstetrics, and one of the first published in England to include engraved plates
1541
George Buchanan
Baptistes
Jephtha
Joachim Sterck van Ringelbergh – Lucubrationes vel potius absolutissima kyklopaideia
1542
Paul Fagius – Liber Fidei seu Veritatis
Edward Hall – The Union of the Two Noble and Illustrate Famelies of Lancastre & Yorke
1543
Nicolaus Copernicus – De revolutionibus orbium coelestium (On the Revolution of the Heavenly Spheres)
Andreas Vesalius – De humani corporis fabrica libri septem (On the Fabric of the Human body in Seven Books)
1544
Cardinal John Fisher – Psalmi seu precationes (posthumous) in an anonymous English translation by its sponsor, Queen Katherine Parr
John Leland – Assertio inclytissimi Arturii regis Britanniae
1545
Roger Ascham – Toxophilus
Bernard Etxepare – Linguae Vasconum Primitiae
Sir John Fortescue – De laudibus legum Angliae (written c. 1471)
Queen Katherine Parr – Prayers or Meditations, the first book published by an English queen under her own name
1546
Sir John Prise of Brecon – Yn y lhyvyr hwnn (first book in Welsh; anonymous)
François Rabelais – Le tiers livre
1547
Gruffudd Hiraethog –  (posthumous collection of Welsh proverbs made by William Salesbury)
Martynas Mažvydas – The Simple Words of Catechism (first printed book in Lithuanian)
Queen Katherine Parr – The Lamentation of a Sinner
William Salesbury – A Dictionary in Englyshe and Welshe
1548
John Bale – Illustrium majoris Britanniae scriptorum, hoc est, Angliae, Cambriae, ac Scotiae Summarium... ("A Summary of the Famous Writers of Great Britain, that is, of England, Wales and Scotland"; 1548–9)
1549
Johannes Aal – Johannes der Täufer (St. John Baptist)
The Complaynt of Scotland
1550
Martin Bucer – De regno Christi
The Facetious Nights of Straparola published in Italian, the first European storybook to contain fairy-tales
1552
François Rabelais – Le quart livre
Gerónimo de Santa Fe – Hebræomastix (posthumous)
Libellus de Medicinalibus Indorum Herbis (Little Book of the Medicinal Herbs of the Indians), composed in Nahuatl by Martín de la Cruz and translated into Latin by Juan Badiano.
1553
Francesco Patrizi – La Città felice ("The Happy City")
1554
Anonymous – Lazarillo de Tormes
1559
The Elizabethan version of the Book of Common Prayer of the Church of England, which remains in use until the mid-17th century and becomes the first English Prayer Book in America
Jorge de Montemayor – Diana
Pavao Skalić – Encyclopediae seu orbis disciplinarum tam sacrarum quam profanarum epistemon
1560
Jacques Grévin – Jules César
William Whittingham, Anthony Gilby, Thomas Sampson – Geneva Bible
1562
William Bullein – Bullein's Bulwarke of Defence againste all Sicknes, Sornes, and Woundes
1563
John Foxe – Foxe's Book of Martyrs
1564
John Dee – Monas Hieroglyphica
1565
Camillo Porzio – La Congiura dei baroni
1567
Joan Perez de Lazarraga – Silbero, Silbia, Doristeo, and Sirena (MS in Basque)
Magdeburg Centuries, vols X-XI
William Salesbury – Testament Newydd ein Arglwydd Iesu Christ (translation of New Testament into Welsh)
Séon Carsuel, Bishop of the Isles – Foirm na n-Urrnuidheadh (translation of Knox's Book of Common Order into Classical Gaelic)
1569
Alonso de Ercilla y Zúñiga – La Araucana, part 1
Petar Zoranić – Planine
1571
Ali Sher Bengali – Sharḥ Nuzhat al-Arwāḥ (in Persian)
François de Belleforest – La Pyrénée (or La Pastorale amoureuse), the first French "pastoral novel"
Aibidil Gaoidheilge agus Caiticiosma (first printing in Irish)
1572
Friedrich Risner – Opticae thesaurus
Turba Philosophorum
1560-1575
Dawlat Wazir Bahram Khan – Laily-Majnu in Bengali
1576
Jean Boudin – Six livres de la République
George Pettie – A Petite Palace of Pettie His Pleasure
The Paradise of Dainty Devices, the most popular of the Elizabethan verse miscellanies
1577
Richard Eden – The History of Travayle in the West and East Indies
Thomas Hill – The Gardener's Labyrinth
Raphael Holinshed – The Chronicles of England, Scotland and Irelande
1578
George Best – A True Discourse of the Late Voyages of Discoverie...under the Conduct of Martin Frobisher
John Florio – First Fruits
Jaroš Griemiller – Rosarium philosophorum
Gabriel Harvey – Smithus, vel Musarum lachrymae
John Lyly – Euphues: the Anatomy of Wit
1579
Stephen Gosson – The Schoole of Abuse
Thomas Lodge – Honest Excuses
1581
Barnabe Riche – 
1582
George Buchanan – Rerum Scoticarum Historia
Richard Hakluyt – Divers VoyagesJohn Leland –  (posthumous translation)
1583
Philip Stubbes – The Anatomy of Abuses1584
James VI of Scotland – Some Reulis and CautelisDavid Powel – Historie of CambriaReginald Scot – The Discovery of Witchcraft1585
Miguel de Cervantes – La GalateaWilliam Davies – Y Drych Cristianogawl1586
John Knox – Historie of the Reformatioun of Religioun within the Realms of ScotlandJohn Lyly – Pappe with an hatchet, alias a figge for my GodsonneGeorge Puttenham (attr.) – The Arte of English Poesie1588
Thomas Hariot – A Briefe and True Report of the New Found Land of VirginiaThomas Nashe – The Anatomie of Absurditie1590
Thomas Lodge – Rosalynde: Euphues Golden LegacieThomas Nashe – An Almond for a Parrat1592
Robert Greene – Greene's Groatsworth of WitGabriel Harvey – Foure Letters and certaine SonnetsRichard Johnson – Nine Worthies of London1594
Sir John Davis – The Seamans SecretsRichard Hooker – Of the Lawes of Ecclesiastical Politie1595
Sir Philip Sidney (posthumous) – An Apology for Poetry (written c. 1579)
1596
Sir Walter Raleigh – The Discoverie of the Large, Rich and Beautiful Empyre of Guiana1597
Francis Bacon – Essays1598
John Bodenham – Politeuphuia (Wits' Commonwealth)King James VI of Scotland – The Trew Law of Free MonarchiesFrancis Meres – Palladis Tamia, Wits TreasuryJohn Stow – Survey of London1599
John Bodenham – Wits' TheaterNew drama
1502The Monologue of the Cowboy1504Beunans Meriasek (Cornish)
1508
Ludovico Ariosto – CassariaThe World and the Child, also known as Mundas et Infans (probable date of composition)
1509
Ludovico Ariosto – I suppositi1513
Juan del Encina – Plácida y Victoriano1517A Trilogia das Barcas1522
Niklaus Manuel Deutsch I – Vom Papst und Christi Gegensatz1523Farsa de Inês Pereira1524
Niklaus Manuel Deutsch I – Vom Papst und seiner Priesterschaft1525
Niklaus Manuel Deutsch I – Der Ablasskrämer1531
Accademia degli Intronati – Gl' Ingannati1536
Hans Ackermann – Der Verlorene Sohn1538
John BaleKynge Johan, the earliest known English historical drama (in verse)Three Laws of Nature, Moses and Christ, corrupted by the Sodomytes, Pharisees and Papystes most wicked1541
Giovanni Battista Giraldi – Orbecche1551
Marin Držić – Dundo Maroje1553
(about 1553) – Gammer Gurton's Needle and Ralph Roister Doister, the first comedies written in English
António Ferreira – Bristo1562
Thomas Norton and Thomas Sackville – GorboducJack Juggler – anonymous, sometimes attributed to Nicholas Udall
1566
George Gascoigne – Supposes1567
John Pickering – Horestes1568
Ulpian Fulwell – Like Will to Like1573
Torquato Tasso – Aminta1582
Giovanni Battista Guarini – Il pastor fido1584
John LylyCampaspeSapho and PhaoGeorge Peele – The Arraignment of ParisRobert Wilson – The Three Ladies of London (published)
1588
George Peele – The Battle of Alcazar (performed)
1589The Rare Triumphs of Love and Fortune – anonymous (published)
1590
Christopher Marlowe – Tamburlaine (both parts published)
George Peele – Famous Chronicle of King Edward the FirstRobert Wilson – The Three Lords and Three Ladies of London (published)
1591
John Lyly – Endymion (published)The Troublesome Reign of King John – Anonymous (published)
1592
Thomas Kyd – The Spanish Tragedy (published)
William Shakespeare – Henry VI, Part 1, Part 2, Part 3Arden of Faversham – anonymous (previously attributed to Shakespeare)
1594
Samuel Daniel – CleopatraRobert GreeneFriar Bacon and Friar Bungay (published)Orlando Furioso (published)
Thomas Lodge & Robert Greene – A Looking Glass for London (published)
Lope de Vega – El maestro de danzar ("The Dancing Master")
George Peele – The Battle of Alcazar (published)
William Shakespeare – Romeo and JulietRobert Wilson – The Cobbler's Prophecy (published)
1595
Anonymous – Locrine (published)
1597
Thomas Nashe and Ben Jonson – The Isle of DogsWilliam Shakespeare – Richard II (published)
1598
Robert Greene – The Scottish Historie of James the Fourth (published)
Ben Jonson – Every Man in His Humour1599
Thomas Dekker – The Shoemaker's HolidayThomas Dekker, Henry Chettle, and William Haughton – Patient GrisselBen Jonson – Every Man Out of His HumourWilliam Shakespeare – Henry VNew poetry
1505
Pietro Bembo – Gli Asolani1514
Francesco Maria Molzo – Translation of the Aeneid into Italian, in consecutive unrhymed verse (forerunner of blank verse)
1516
Ludovico Ariosto – Orlando Furioso (first version, April)
1527
Pietro Aretino – Sonetti Lussuriosi ("Sonnets of lust" or "Aretino's Postures", to accompany an edition of Raimondi's erotic engravings, I Modi)
1528
Anna Bijns – Refrains1530
Pietro Bembo – RimeBy 1534
"A Gest of Robyn Hode"
1550
Sir Thomas Wyatt – Pentential Psalms1557
Giovanni Battista Giraldi – ErcoleTottel's Miscellany1562
Arthur Brooke – The Tragical History of Romeus and JulietTorquato Tasso – Rinaldo1563
Barnabe Googe – Eclogues, Epitaphs, and Sonnets1567
George Turberville – Epitaphs, Epigrams, Songs and Sonnets1572
Luís de Camões – Os Lusíadas1573
George Gascoigne – A Hundred Sundry Flowers1575
Nicholas Breton – A Small Handful of Fragrant FlowersGeorge Gascoigne – The Posies1576The Paradise of Dainty Devices, the most popular of the Elizabethan verse miscellanies
1577
Nicholas Breton – The Works of a Young Wit and A Flourish upon Fancy1579
Edmund Spenser – The Shepherd's Calendar1581
Torquato Tasso – Jerusalem DeliveredThomas Watson – Hekatompathia or Passionate Century of Love1586
Luis Barahona de Soto – Primera parte de la Angélica1590
Sir Philip Sidney – ArcadiaEdmund Spenser – The Faerie Queene, Books 1–3
1591
Sir Philip Sidney – Astrophel and Stella (published posthumously)
1592
Henry Constable – Diana1593
Michael Drayton – The Shepherd's GarlandGiles Fletcher, the Elder – Licia1594
Michael Drayton – Peirs Gaveston1595
Thomas Campion – Poemata1596
Sir John Davies – Orchestra, or a Poeme of DauncingMichael Drayton – The Civell Warres of Edward the Second and the BarronsEdmund Spenser – The Faerie Queene, Books 1–6
1597
Michael Drayton – Englands Heroicall Epistles1598
Lope de VegaLa ArcadiaLa Dragontea1599
Sir John DaviesHymnes of AstraeaNosce TeipsumGeorge Peele – The Love of King David and Faire BethsabeBirths
c. 1501 – Garcilaso de la Vega, Spanish soldier and poet (died 1536)
1503 – Thomas Wyatt
1504 – Nicholas Udall (died 1556)
1508 – Primož Trubar, author of the first printed books in Slovene (died 1586)
1510 – Martynas Mažvydas
1511 – Johannes Secundus (died 1535)
1513 – Daniele Barbaro (died 1570)
1515 – Roger Ascham
1515 – Johann Weyer, Dutch occultist (died 1588)
1517 – Henry Howard
c. 1520 – Christophe Plantin, printer (died 1589)
1524 – Luís de Camões (died 1580)
1547 – Miguel de Cervantes (died 1616)
1551 – William Camden
1554 – Philip Sidney
1555 – Lancelot Andrewes
1558 – Robert Greene
1558 – Thomas Kyd
1561 – Luís de Góngora y Argote, Spanish poet (died 1627)
1562 – Lope de Vega, Spanish poet and dramatist (died 1635)
1564 – Henry Chettle, English dramatist (died 1607)
1564 – Christopher Marlowe, English poet and dramatist (died 1593)
1564 – William Shakespeare, English poet and dramatist (died 1616)
1570 – Robert Aytoun
1572 – Ben Jonson, John Donne
1576 – John Marston
1577 – Robert Burton
1580 – Francisco de Quevedo (died 1645)
1581 – Pieter Corneliszoon Hooft
1583 – Philip Massinger
1587 – Joost van den Vondel
1594 – James Howell

Deaths
1502
Felix Fabri (Felix Faber), Swiss Dominican theologian and travel writer (born c. 1441)
Henry Medwall, English dramatist (born c. 1462)
1513 – Robert Fabyan, English chronicler and sheriff (year of birth unknown)
1515 – Aldus Manutius, Italian publisher (born 1449)
1527 – Ludovico Vicentino degli Arrighi, Italian calligrapher and type designer (born 1475)
1534 – Wynkyn de Worde, Lotharingian-born English printer
1536 – Johannes Secundus, Dutch poet writing in Latin (born 1511)
1542 – Thomas Wyatt, English poet (born 1503)
1546 – Meera, Indian poet and mystic (born 1498)
1552 – Alexander Barclay, English or Scottish poet (born c. 1476)
1553
Hanibal Lucić, Croatian poet and playwright (born c. 1485)
François Rabelais, French writer and polymath (year of birth unknown)
1555 – Polydore Vergil (Polydorus Vergilius), Italian scholar (born c. 1470)
1563
John Bale, English historian, controversialist and bishop (born 1495)
Martynas Mažvydas, Lithuanian religious writer (born 1510)
1566 – Marco Girolamo Vida, Italian poet (born 1485?)
30 December 1568 – Roger Ascham, English scholar and didact (born 1515)
1570 – Daniele Barbaro, Italian writer, translator and cardinal (born 1513)
1577 – George Gascoigne, English poet and soldier (born c. 1535)
1580 or 1582 – Wu Cheng'en, Chinese writer (born c. 1500)
1584 – Jan Kochanowski, Polish poet (born 1530)
1585 – Pierre de Ronsard, French poet (born 1524)
1586 – Primož Trubar, Slovene author (born 1508)
1588 – Johann Weyer, Dutch occultist (born 1515)
1 July 1589 – Christophe Plantin, Dutch humanist and printer (born c. 1520)
3 September 1592 – Robert Greene, English dramatist (born 1558)
30 May 1593 – Christopher Marlowe, English dramatist, poet and translator (born 1564)
15 August 1594 (burial) – Thomas Kyd, English dramatist (born 1558)
5 November 1595 – Luis Barahona de Soto, Spanish poet (born 1548)

In literature
The main action of Peter Shaffer's drama The Royal Hunt of the Sun'' (1964) is set in 1532–33.

See also
16th century in poetry
15th century in literature
17th century in literature
List of years in literature
Early Modern literature
Renaissance literature

References

 
 
Renaissance literature
Early Modern literature
History of literature